Montepiano is a village built on an appenninic pass at 800 m above sea level in the municipality of Vernio in the Italian region of Tuscany.  The village has a population of 600, but due to tourism the population triples during the summer. It is common for people living in the nearby city of Prato to have summer homes in Montepiano.

Overview
Montepiano has two churches, the abbey and Santa Maria church.  Nearby Lake Fiorenzo is often used for fishing.  The town is located in the Setta Valley near Emilia-Romagna and the motorway exits of Roncobilaccio and Pian del Voglio. Montepiano hosts an annual sports event called Da Piazza a Piazza. Near the village other little localities, part of Montepiano, such as Risubbiani, La Storaia, Castagnaccio and Mulinaccio.  Villa Sperling and Villa Principessa Strozzi are located nearby.

Gallery

External links

 Pro Loco Montepiano

Frazioni of the Province of Prato